The black mudalia (Elimia melanoides)  is a species of freshwater snail in the family Pleuroceridae. It is endemic to the Black Warrior River system of Alabama in the United States. It was thought to be extinct until it was rediscovered during a 1996 survey.

Studies indicate that the species is better treated in genus Elimia.

References

Molluscs of the United States
Leptoxis
Endemic fauna of Alabama
Gastropods described in 1834
Taxa named by Timothy Abbott Conrad
Taxonomy articles created by Polbot